The United States competed at the 1960 Summer Olympics in Rome, Italy. It was the first Summer Olympics in which the athletes marched under the present 50-star flag. 292 competitors, 241 men and 51 women, took part in 147 events in 17 sports.
The 1960 Summer Olympics was the first Olympics in history that was being covered by a television provider.  American network CBS became the first official broadcaster of the games, by purchasing the rights to cover the Rome Olympics.
The 1960 Summer Olympics also brought one of the first appearances of one of the greatest heavyweight boxers ever, Muhammad Ali. Since these Olympic Games occurred before his conversion to Islam, he fought under the name Cassius Clay.

Names of United States Olympic gold medal winners: Wilbert McClure, Eddie Crook, Jr., Cassius Clay, Otis Davis (2), Lee Calhoun, Glenn Davis, Jack Yerman, Earl Young, Ralph Boston, Don Brags, Bill Nieder, Al Oerter, Rafer Johnson, Wilma Rudolph (3), Martha Hudson, Lucinda Williams, Barbara Jones, Jay Arnette, Walt Bellamy, Bob Boozer, Terry Dischinger, Burdette Haldorson, Darall Imhoff, Allen Kelley, Lester Lane, Jerry Lucas, Oscar Robertson, Adrian Smith, Jerry West, Gary Tobian, Bob Webster, Arthur Ayrault, Ted Nash, John Sayre, Rusty Wailes, George O'Day, James Hunt, David Smith, William McMillan, William Mulliken, Michael Troy(2), George Harrison, Richard Blick, Jeff Farrel(2), Frank McKinney, Paul Hait, Lance Larson, Chris Von Saltza(3), Lynn Burke(2), Carolyn Schuler(2), Joan Spillane, Shirley Stobs, Carolyn Wood, Patty Kempner, Charles Linci, Terrence McCann, Shelby Wilson, Douglas Blubaugh.

Athletics

Men's Competition
Men's 100 meters 

Men's 200 meters 

Silver Medal: Lester Carney

Men's 400 meters 

 
Men's 800 meters 

Men's 1.500 meters 
Dyrol Burleson
Jim Grelle
Pete Close

Men's 5,000 meters 
Bill Dellinger
Jim Beatty
Bob Soth

Men's 10,000 meters 
Max Truex

Men's Marathon 
John J. Kelley
Alex Breckenridge
Gordon McKenzie

Men's 110 meter Hurdles 

Men's 400 meter Hurdles 

Men's 3,000 meter Steeplechase 
Deacon Jones
George Young
Phil Coleman

Men's 4 × 100 m Relay 

Men's 4 × 400 m Relay 

Men's 20 km Walk 

Men's 50 km Walk 

  
Men's Long Jump 

 
Men's triple jump 

Men's High Jump 

  
Men's Pole Vault 

 
Men's Shot Put 

Men's Javelin Throw 

Men's Discus Throw 
Al Oerter

Men's Hammer Throw

 
Men's Decathlon 

Women's Competition
Women's 100 meters 

Women's 200 meters 

 
Women's 400 meters 

 
Women's 800 meters 

 
Women's 4 × 100 m Relay 

Women's 80m Hurdles 

Women's Long Jump 

 
Women's High Jump 

Women's Shot Put 

Women's Javelin Throw

Women's Discus Throw

Women's Pentathlon

Basketball

Boxing

Canoeing

Cycling

14 cyclists represented the United States in 1960.

Individual road race
 Michael Hiltner
 Lars Zebroski
 Wes Chowen
 Rob Tetzlaff

Team time trial
 Bill Freund
 Michael Hiltner
 Wes Chowen
 Rob Tetzlaff

Sprint
 Herbert Francis
 Jackie Simes

1000m time trial
 Allen Bell

Tandem
 Jack Hartman
 David Sharp

Team pursuit
 Richard Cortright
 Charles Hewett
 Robert Pfarr
 James Rossi

Diving

Equestrian

Fencing

21 fencers represented the United States in 1960.

Men's foil
 Albie Axelrod
 Gene Glazer
 Joseph Paletta, Jr.

Men's team foil
 Gene Glazer, Hal Goldsmith, Joseph Paletta, Jr., Albie Axelrod, Daniel Bukantz

Men's épée
 David Micahnik
 Ralph Spinella
 James Margolis

Men's team épée
 James Margolis, Roland Wommack, David Micahnik, Henry Kolowrat, Jr., Ralph Spinella

Men's sabre
 Michael D'Asaro, Sr.
 Allan Kwartler
 Alfonso Morales

Men's team sabre
 Allan Kwartler, George Worth, Michael D'Asaro, Sr., Alfonso Morales, Tibor Nyilas, Dick Dyer

Women's foil
 Jan York-Romary
 Evelyn Terhune
 Harriet King

Women's team foil
 Judy Goodrich, Jan York-Romary, Maxine Mitchell, Harriet King, Evelyn Terhune

Gymnastics

Modern pentathlon

Three pentathletes represented the United States in 1960. They won a bronze medal in the team event and Bob Beck won an individual bronze.

Individual
 Bob Beck
 Jack Daniels
 George Lambert

Team
 Bob Beck
 Jack Daniels
 George Lambert

Rowing

The United States had 26 rowers participate in all seven rowing events in 1960.

 Men's single sculls
 Harry Parker

 Men's double sculls
 John B. Kelly Jr.
 Bill Knecht

 Men's coxless pair
 Ted Frost
 Bob Rogers

 Men's coxed pair
 Richard Draeger
 Conn Findlay
 Kent Mitchell (cox)

 Men's coxless four
 Arthur Ayrault
 Ted Nash
 John Sayre
 Rusty Wailes

 Men's coxed four
 Chuck Alm
 Roy Rubin
 Monte Stocker
 Mike Yonker
 Kurt Seiffert (cox)

 Men's eight
 Joe Baldwin
 Peter Bos
 Mark Moore
 Lyman S. Perry
 Skip Sweetser
 Gayle Thompson
 Robert Wilson
 Howard Winfree
 William Long (cox)

Sailing

Shooting

Nine shooters represented the United States in 1960. Bill McMillan won gold in the 25 m pistol and Jim Hill won silver in the 50 m rifle, prone.

25 m pistol
 Bill McMillan
 Laurence Mosely

50 m pistol
 Nelson Lincoln
 John Hurst

300 m rifle, three positions
 John Foster
 Daniel Puckel

50 m rifle, three positions
 Daniel Puckel
 Jim Hill

50 m rifle, prone
 Jim Hill
 Daniel Puckel

Trap
 James Clark
 Arnold Riegger

Swimming

Water polo

Weightlifting

Wrestling

See also
United States at the 1959 Pan American Games
United States at the 1960 Summer Paralympics

References

Nations at the 1960 Summer Olympics
1960
Oly